A central lunar eclipse is a lunar eclipse in which part of the Moon passes through the center of Earth's shadow. This type of lunar eclipse typically appears darker than other lunar eclipses. It is relatively rare.

Central lunar eclipses are always total lunar eclipses and have large umbral eclipse magnitude, long duration and small value of gamma.

List of central lunar eclipses

1901–1950 

There were 19 central lunar eclipses in this period.

1951–2000 

There were 14 central lunar eclipses in this period.

2001–2050 

There are 10 central lunar eclipses in this period.

2051–2100 

There will be 15 central lunar eclipses in this period.

2101-2150

See also 
 List of lunar eclipses
 List of 20th-century lunar eclipses
 List of 21st-century lunar eclipses
 List of Saros series for lunar eclipses

References

 www.hermit.org: Saros 120 (20 central from 1559–1902)
 www.hermit.org: Saros 121 (22 central from 1570–1949)
 www.hermit.org: Saros 122 (22 central from 1617–1996)
 www.hermit.org: Saros 123 (16 central from 1682–1953)
 www.hermit.org: Saros 124 (12 central from 1711–1909)
 www.hermit.org: Saros 125 (10 central from 1758–1920)
 www.hermit.org: Saros 126 (8 central from 1805–1931)
 www.hermit.org: Saros 127 (8 central from 1834–1960)
 www.hermit.org: Saros 128 (7 central from 1899–2007)
 www.hermit.org: Saros 129 (6 central from 1946–2036)
 www.hermit.org: Saros 130 (7 central from 1975–2083)
 www.hermit.org: Saros 131 (8 central from 2042–2148)
 www.hermit.org: Saros 132 (7 central from 2069–2177)
 www.hermit.org: Saros 133 (8 central from 2098–2224)
 www.hermit.org: Saros 134 (10 central from 2127–2289)
 www.hermit.org: Saros 135 (8 central from 2174–2318)
 www.hermit.org: Saros 136 (20 central from 2022–2365)
 www.hermit.org: Saros 137 (21 central from 2051–2412)
 www.hermit.org: Saros 138 (19 central from 2116–2441)
 www.hermit.org: Saros 139 (22 central from 2109–2488)